Höchsten is a mountain of Baden-Württemberg, Germany.

External links 

Mountains and hills of Baden-Württemberg